Alabonia geoffrella is a species of gelechioid moth. Here, it is placed within the subfamily Oecophorinae of the concealer moth family (Oecophoridae). Alternatively it has been placed in the Elachistidae or Depressariinae together with its presumed closest relatives.

Description
 The adults fly from May to June depending on the location. The wingspan of this day-flying (or diurnal) moth is 17–21 mm, and it is quite colorful, with a light to dark rusty-red background, bold white markings and a more delicate metallic-blue pattern. The labial palps are conspicuously enlarged. Meyrick describes it - Head and thorax are yellow, with a central dark fuscous stripe. Forewings yellow, posteriorly becoming deeper and suffused with dark fuscous,especially on veins; a bluish-silvery blackish-edged streak from base above middle to 2/5, thence bent down to join a similar straight subdorsal streak from base above middle of dorsum; a bluish-silvery blackish-edged transverse streak from costa before middle to disc; a large whitish -yellow dark -edged triangular spot on costa at 2/3, and another before tornus. Hindwings dark fuscous.

The caterpillars feed on rotting wood; mostly living under tree bark, they have also been found inside dead branches of common hazel (Corylus avellana) and blackberries (Rubus subgenus Rubus section Rubus).

Distribution and habitat
Alabonia geoffrella is found in Europe, where it is not rare in many woodlands and marshlands.

Footnotes

References
  (1942): Eigenartige Geschmacksrichtungen bei Kleinschmetterlingsraupen ["Strange tastes among micromoth caterpillars"]. Zeitschrift des Wiener Entomologen-Vereins 27: 105-109 [in German]. PDF fulltext
  [2010]: UKMoths – Alabonia geoffrella. Retrieved 2010-APR-27.
  (2004): Butterflies and Moths of the World, Generic Names and their Type-species – Alabonia. Version of 2004-NOV-05. Retrieved 2010-APR-27.
  (2001): Markku Savela's Lepidoptera and some other life forms – Alabonia. Version of 2001-NOV-07. Retrieved 2010-APR-27.

External links

Alabonia geoffrella on UKmoths
Lepiforum.de

Oecophorinae
Moths of Europe
Moths described in 1767
Taxa named by Carl Linnaeus